Golin is a language of Papua New Guinea.

Golin may also refer to:
Golin, Iran, a village in Kurdistan Province, Iran
Golin, Lubusz Voivodeship, Poland
Golin, Myślibórz County, Poland
Golin, Wałcz County, Poland
Golin (PR firm), a public relations firm
Steve Golin (1955–2019), founder and CEO of Anonymous Content LLP
Lino Golin, Italian footballer